Olepa ocellifera is a moth of the family Erebidae first described by Francis Walker in 1855. It is found in India and Sri Lanka.

Description

Ths species closely resembles the much more widely distributed Olepa ricini, and differs only in the presence of a chain-like series of small yellow-banded black spots in between the large spots on the forewings, which are lacking in O. ricini. Head and thorax dark greyish brown. Collar fringed with crimson and with a pair of pale-ringed black spots. Tegulae with two pairs and vertex of thorax with one similar spot. Abdomen crimson with a series of short dorsal black bands and lateral spots. Forewings are fuscous brown with very numerous pale-ringed black spots in the interspaces. Hindwing crimson, with ante-medial, medial, post-medial and marginal bands and more or less conjoined blotches. Larva dark brown in body colour with white and dorsal and lateral tufts of long dark hair.

References

Spilosomina
Moths described in 1855